Dorothy Cox may refer to:
 Dorothy Cox (archaeologist)
 Dorothy Cox (artist)
 Diana Wynyard, born Dorothy Isobel Cox, English stage and film actress